Zinaspa is an Indomalayan genus of butterflies in the family Lycaenidae.

Species
Zinaspa zana de Nicéville, 1898
Zinaspa todara (Moore, [1884]) - silver-streaked acacia blue
Zinaspa youngi Hsu & Johnson, 1998
Zinaspa distorta (de Nicéville, 1887)

External links
"Zinaspa de Nicéville in Marshall & de Nicéville, 1890" at Markku Savela's Lepidoptera and Some Other Life Forms

Arhopalini
Lycaenidae genera
Taxa named by Lionel de Nicéville